In Internet routing, the default-free zone (DFZ) is the collection of all Internet autonomous systems (AS) that do not require a default route to route a packet to any destination. Conceptually, DFZ routers have a "complete" Border Gateway Protocol table, sometimes referred to as the Internet routing table, global routing table or global BGP table. However, internet routing changes rapidly and the widespread use of route filtering ensures that no router has a complete view of all routes. Any routing table created would look different from the perspective of different routers, even if a stable view could be achieved.

Highly connected Autonomous Systems and routers 

The Weekly Routing Reports used by the ISP community come from the Asia-Pacific Network Information Centre (APNIC) router in Tokyo, which is a well-connected router that has as good a view of the Internet as any other single router. For serious routing research, however, routing information will be captured at multiple well-connected sites, including high-traffic ISPs (see the "skitter core") below.

As of May 12, 2014, there were 494,105 routes seen by the APNIC router. These came from 46,795 autonomous systems, of which only 172 were transit-only and 35787 were stub/origin-only. 6087 autonomous systems provided some level of transit.

The Idea of an "Internet core" 

The term "default-free zone" is sometimes confused with an "Internet core" or Internet backbone, but there has been no true "core" since before the Border Gateway Protocol (BGP) was introduced. In pre-BGP days, when the Exterior Gateway Protocol (EGP) was the exterior routing protocol, it indeed could be assumed there was a single Internet core.

That concept, however, has been obsolete for a long time. At best, today's definition of the Internet core is statistical, with the "skitter core" being some number of AS with the greatest traffic according to the CAIDA measurements, previously made with its measuring tool called "skitter".  The CAIDA measurements are constantly updated.

Information at Internet Exchange Points 

Large Internet Exchange Points (IXP)—in that they typically include full routes as seen by multiple ISPs, as well as customer routes, in their exchange fabric—are extremely good places to assess global Internet routing.

Before the current commercial Internet evolved, the NSFNET, which interconnected five US government funded supercomputer centers, could have been considered the high-speed Internet core. Four IXPs supported NSFNET, but these IXPs evolved into a model where commercial traffic could meet there. While it is slightly difficult to point to a precise endpoint, NSF funding for transmission ceased by 1998.

Customer, non-ISP Participation in the DFZ 

It is common practice, in a multihomed but stub (i.e., non-transit) autonomous system, for the BGP-speaking router(s) to take "full routes" from the various ISPs to which the AS is multihomed.  Especially if there is more than one router connected to the same ISP, a common practice, it will receive more routes than are in the DFZ.  This is because when there are two routers connected to a major ISP such as Sprint, France Telecom or Qwest, that provider has a number of customer AS connected to it. The optimal route to those customer AS are important to the ISP itself, but also tells one customer AS which specific router has the best path to the other customer. The "full routes", or properly "full routes plus customer routes", coming to a customer router makes that customer router part of the DFZ, but certainly not part of the "skitter core".

See also 
 Multihoming
 IP transit
 Peering
 Route filtering
 512K Day

References 

Internet Standards
Routing